Kamalakara Kameswara Rao (14 October 1911 – 29 June 1998) was an Indian film director known for his works predominantly in Telugu cinema, and a few Tamil and Hindi films. Widely known as Pauranika Chitra Brahma, Kameswara Rao directed fifty feature films in a variety of genres.

In 1960 he directed the biographical film, Mahakavi Kalidasu which won the President's silver medal for Best Feature Film in Telugu. In 1962 he directed Gundamma Katha which was commercially successful and received the Filmfare Award for Best Film – Telugu. In the same year, he directed another biographical film, Mahamantri Timmarusu which won the President's silver medal for Best Feature Film in Telugu at the 10th National Film Awards.

In 1963, Rao directed the blockbuster, epic mythological film Nartanasala. The film is cited among CNN-IBN'''s list of the hundred greatest Indian films of all time. The film has received wide critical acclaim and has garnered the National Film Award for Second Best Feature Film at the 11th National Film Awards, and has secured the Filmfare Award for Best Telugu Film.

Life sketch
He was born in 1911 in Machilipatnam. He has completed Bachelor of Arts from the Noble College, Machilipatnam. He has worked as a Film journalist for Krishna Patrika between 1934 and 1937. His unbiased reviews about the released films are highly appreciated by the audiences.

On invitation from H. M. Reddy, he has reached Madras. He has joined as assistant director and worked with K. V. Reddy and Moola Narayana Swamy for the film Gruhalakshmi in 1938. He has worked as assistant director for the films Vande Mataram, Sumangali, Devatha and Swarga Seema under Bomireddi Narasimha Reddy and for Bhakta Potana and Yogi Vemana under K. V. Reddy.

After observing him closely, Vijaya Productions has given the responsibility of independently direct Chandraharam in 1954 which was not commercially successful. He has left Vijaya Productions in 1955. He has directed about 30 films of National Art Theatres, Rajyam Pictures, Ponnaloori Brothers, Padmalaya Pictures, Mahija pictures and Suresh Productions over the period of three decades. He used to describe the film Nartanasala (1963) as his best directoral work, which won many National and International awards.

Death
Rao died at the age of 88 years on 29 June 1998 due to cardiac arrest.

Filmography

Director
 Chandraharam (Telugu & Tamil) (1954)
 Guna Sundari (Tamil) (1955)
 Penki Pellam (1956)
 Panduranga Mahatyam (1957)
 Sobha (1958)
 Raja Sevai (1959)
 Rechukka Pagatichukka (1959)
 Mahakavi Kalidasu (Telugu & Tamil) (1960)
 Mahamantri Timmarusu (1962)
 Gundamma Katha (1962)
 Narthanasala (1963)
 Pandava Vanavasamu (1965)
 Shakuntala (1966)
 Sri Krishna Tulabharam (Telugu & Tamil) (1966)
 Kambojaraju Katha (1967)
 Sri Krishnavataram (Telugu & Tamil) (1967)
 Kalasina Manushulu (1968)
 Veeranjaneya (1968)
 Mayani Mamata (1970)
 Sri Krishna Vijayamu (1970)
 Bala Bharatam (1972)
 Jeevitaashayam (1974)
 Kurukshetram (1977) 
 Seetha Rama Vanavasam (1977)
 Gnana Kuzhandhai (1979)
 Sri Vinayaka Vijayamu (1980)
 Sri Vasavi Kanyaka Parameswari Mahatyam (1980)
 Deiva Thirumanangal (1981) (Valli Thirumanam part only)
 Ekalavya (1982)
 Santoshi Mata Vrata Mahatmyamu (1983)
 Badarinatha Darshanam (1985)
 Sri Datta Darsanam (1985)
 Ashtalakshmi Vaibhavamu (1986)
 Devi Navagraha Nayaki (1986)
 Edu Kondalaswami (1991)

Assistant director
 Gruhalakshmi (1938)
 Vande Mataram (1939)
 Sumangali (1940)
 Devatha (1941)
 Bhakta Potana (1942)
 Swargaseema (1945)
 Yogi Vemana (1947)
 Gunasundari Katha (1949)
 Patala Bhairavi (1951) 
 Guna Sundari (1955)

Awards
National Film Awards
 National Film Award for Second Best Feature Film in 1964 - Nartanasala.
 1962: President's silver medal for Best Feature Film in Telugu - Mahamantri Timmarusu 1960: President's silver medal for Best Feature Film in Telugu - Mahakavi Kalidasu''

See also
I. Panduranga Rao

References

External links
 

Telugu film directors
1911 births
1998 deaths
20th-century Indian film directors
People from Krishna district
Film directors from Andhra Pradesh
People from Machilipatnam